Udo Voigt (born 14 April 1952) is a German politician and former Member of the European Parliament (MEP) for the far-right and Neo-Nazi party National Democratic Party of Germany (NPD) between 2014 and 2019. He was a member of the European Parliament Committee on Civil Liberties, Justice and Home Affairs. He served as leader of NPD from 1996 to 2011. By profession, he is a former captain in the German Air Force and has a master's degree in political science from LMU. Voigt has in recent years become a strong supporter of Vladimir Putin and has said that Germany should have "a chancellor like Putin."

Early life and career
The son of a former Wehrmacht officer, Voigt was born in Viersen. After graduating from high school, he became an airframe mechanic apprentice. In 1971, he had studied aerospace engineering at the Aachen University of Applied Sciences for two terms, but did not graduate. In 1972, he was conscripted by the Bundeswehr. Later, he worked in the German Air Force from 1972 to 1984 and graduated as an officer from the Luftwaffe Officer's School. He served in Germany and at a NATO facility in Greece. Between 1982 and 1987, he studied political science at the Munich School of Political Science and graduated with a master's degree in political science from LMU.

Political career 

Voigt joined the NPD at age 16 in 1968.
 
He was elected as party chairman in 1996, succeeding Günter Deckert. From September 2006 till 2010, Voigt was an elected member of the Berlin municipal government in the Treptow-Köpenick district. He has been previously unsuccessful in the European Parliament elections and when running for mayor of Saarbrücken.

On 13 March 2008, Voigt was charged (for at least the second time) with incitement ("Volksverhetzung") for distributing racially charged pamphlets. In 2009, he was given a seven-month suspended sentence and ordered to donate €2,000 to UNICEF. Voigt protested against the charge, claiming it was politically motivated.

On 13 November 2011, Voigt was replaced as leader of the NPD by Holger Apfel.

Voigt was elected as a member of the European Parliament in the 2014 European Elections.

References

External links

 

1952 births
Living people
People from Viersen
German nationalists
National Democratic Party of Germany politicians
National Democratic Party of Germany MEPs
Leaders of political parties in Germany
German Air Force personnel
MEPs for Germany 2014–2019